The Proton Iriz R5 is a R5 rally car built by Mellors Elliott Motorsport in the UK under license from Proton. It is based upon the Proton Iriz road car. The car marked the comeback of the British Rally Championship for Proton.

In 2022, the rally car was succeeded by the Proton Iriz RX (Rallycross), which was built specifically for Team RX Racing and Oliver O'Donovan.

References

External links
 
 Proton Iriz R5 at eWRC-results.com

All-wheel-drive vehicles
Proton vehicles
R5 cars